Biem may be,

Biem, South Sudan
Biem language
Biem Benyamin
Biem Dudok van Heel
Bam Island (Papua New Guinea), also known as Biem

See also
BIEM